Tempo Records may refer to:

 Tempo Records (US), a United States-based company
 Tempo Records (UK), a United Kingdom-based company

See also
 List of record labels
 Tempo (disambiguation)